Acrochordonichthys septentrionalis, the Maeklong chameleon catfish, is a species of catfish of the family Akysidae. A detailed discussion of this species's relationship with the other members of its genus can be found on Acrochordonichthys.

This species is known from Thailand and from Peninsular Malaysia.

References

External links

Akysidae
Freshwater fish of Malaysia
Fish of Thailand
Fish described in 2001